Robyn Davidson (born 6 September 1950) is an Australian writer best known for her 1980 book Tracks, about her 2,700 km (1,700 miles) trek across the deserts of Western Australia using camels. Her career of travelling and writing about her travels has spanned 40 years.

Biography 

Robyn Davidson was born at Stanley Park, a cattle station in Miles, Queensland, the second of two girls. When Robyn was 11 years old, her mother committed suicide, and she was largely raised by her unmarried aunt (her father's sister), Gillian. She went to a girls' boarding school in Brisbane. She received a music scholarship but did not take it up. In Brisbane, Robyn shared a house with biologists and studied zoology. In 1968, aged 18, she went to Sydney and later lived a bohemian life in a Sydney Push household at Paddington, while working as a card-dealer at an illegal gambling house.

In 1975, Robyn moved to Alice Springs in an effort to work with camels for a desert trek she was planning. For two years she trained camels and learned how to survive in the harsh desert. She was peripherally involved in the Aboriginal Land Rights movement.

For some years in the 1980s she was in a relationship with the Indian novelist, Salman Rushdie, to whom she was introduced by their mutual friend Bruce Chatwin.

Robyn has moved frequently, and had homes in Sydney, London, and India. , she resides in Castlemaine, Victoria, Australia.

Tracks
In 1977, Robyn set off from Alice Springs for the west coast, with a dog and four camels, Dookie (a large male), Bub (a smaller male), Zeleika (a wild female), and Goliath (Zeleika's offspring). She had no intention of writing about the journey, but eventually agreed to write an article for the magazine National Geographic. Having met the photographer Rick Smolan in Alice Springs, she insisted that he be the photographer for the journey. Smolan, with whom she had an "on-again off-again" romantic relationship during the trip, drove out to meet her three times during the nine-month journey.

The National Geographic article was published in 1978 and attracted so much interest that Robyn decided to write a book about the experience. She travelled to London and lived with Doris Lessing while writing Tracks. Tracks won the inaugural Thomas Cook Travel Book Award in 1980 and the Blind Society Award. In the early nineties, Smolan published his pictures of the trip in From Alice to Ocean. It included the first interactive story-and-photo CDs made for the general public.

It has been suggested that one of the reasons Tracks was so popular, particularly with women, is that Robyn "places herself in the wilderness of her own accord, rather than as an adjunct to a man".

Robyn's desert journey is remembered by Aboriginal Australians she encountered along the way. Artist Jean Burke remembers Robyn in a painting called The Camel Lady which was produced for a Warakurna Artists' exhibition in Darwin in 2011. Burke's father, Mr Eddie, had trekked through Ngaanyatjarra lands with Robyn, guiding her to water sources along the way. Robyn mentions Mr Eddie in Tracks.

Film adaptation
In 2013, a film adaptation directed by John Curran and starring Mia Wasikowska was completed. The film Tracks screened at the Venice Film Festival.

Nomads
The majority of Robyn's work has been travelling with and studying nomadic peoples. Jane Sullivan in The Age writes that "while she is often called a social anthropologist", she has no academic qualifications and says that she is "completely self-taught". Davidson's experiences with nomads include traveling on migration with nomads in India from 1990 to 1992. These experiences were published in Desert Places.

She has studied different forms of the nomad lifestyle — including those in Australia, India, and Tibet — for a book and a documentary series. Her writing on nomads is based mainly on personal experience, and she brings many of her thoughts together in No Fixed Address, her contribution to the Quarterly Essay series. Sullivan writes about this work:

One of the questions we need to ask, if we are to have a future, she says, is "Where did we cause less damage to ourselves, to our environment, and to our animal kin?" One answer is: when we were nomadic. "It is when we settled that we became strangers in a strange land, and wandering took on the quality of banishment," she writes, and then later adds: "I shall probably be accused of romanticism".

References in popular culture
Davidson is the subject of a song written by Irish folk singer and songwriter Mick Hanly. The song, "Crusader", was recorded by Mary Black on her 1983 self-titled album.

The film Tracks is based on Robyn Davidson's memoir of the same name.

Bibliography

 
 
 
 
 
 
 
 

Screenplays
 Mail Order Bride (1987 feature film for Australian Broadcasting Corporation)

References

Sources

External links
 No Fixed Address – transcript of a talk by Davidson in December 2006 on Perspective program, ABC Radio National
 Robyn Davidson in conversation – MP3 download of conversation with Richard Fidler ABC Local Radio 6 December 2006
 Nomadic cultures, journeys and coming home, Robyn Davidson joins desert archaeologist Mike Smith for a discussion about her travels in Australia, India, China and Tibet, National Museum of Australia, Historical Interpretation series, 16 September 2007
 Robyn Davidson at talking heads, 1 September 2008.
 Participation at Germaine's Legacy – After The Female Eunuch – session at Adelaide Writers' Week, April 2008
 "Robyn Davidson reflects on 40 years since 'Tracks'" - talk with Hilary Harper on ABC Radio National "Life Matters" in March 2018.
 

1950 births
Living people
Australian explorers
Australian travel writers
Australian women writers
Explorers of Australia
Female explorers
Granta people
Women travel writers